Manuel Belisario Moreno (died 1917) was an Ecuadorian writer and priest.

Belisario Moreno is best known as the author of the novel Naya o La Chapetona (1900).

He is the father of the sculptor Alfredo Palacio Moreno (1912-1998) and the grandfather of the former Ecuadorian President Alfredo Palacio González (in office 2005-2007).

References 

1856 births
1917 deaths
Ecuadorian male writers
Ecuadorian novelists